Dara Hormusji Variava was an Indian politician. He was a Member of Parliament, representing Gujarat in the Rajya Sabha the upper house of India's Parliament representing the Indian National Congress.

See also
Variav

References

Rajya Sabha members from Gujarat
1897 births
1961 deaths